Om Prakash Bhasin Award for Science and Technology is an Indian award, instituted in 1985 to recognize excellence in the areas of science and technology. The award, given individually or collectively to a group, is annual in cycle and carries a plaque, a citation and a cash prize of  100,000. The winners are invited to deliver the Om Prakash Bhasin Memorial Lecture at a venue decided by the award committee.

Profile
Om Prakash Bhasin Awards have been instituted by Shri Om Prakash Bhasin Foundation, a New Delhi-based charitable organization founded by Vinod Bhasin, along with her two sons, Shivy Bhasin and Hemant Kumar Bhasin, to honour the memory of her husband, Om Prakash Bhasin, a non resident Indian businessman. The corpus for the award of  5,100,000 was formed by Om Prakash Bhasin as a trust before his death. The awards, started in 1985, are given in five categories. The selection is through a notified procedure and is decided by a committee appointed for the purpose. The committee includes the Chairman of the foundation, two trustees representing the foundation, a member of the scientific community and a representative of the State Bank of India, the bankers to the foundation. The incumbent committee members are:
 Shivy Bhasin - Chairman
 Hemant Kumar Bhasin - Foundation trustee 
 Vinod Prakash Sharma - Scientist trustee 
 Samar Vikram Bhasin - Foundation trustee
 State Bank of India nominee

Categories

 Agriculture and Allied Sciences
 Biotechnology
 Electronics and Information Technology
 Engineering including Energy and Aerospace
 Health and Medical Sciences

Recipients

Agriculture and Allied Sciences
Source: Shri Om Prakash Bhasin Foundation

Biotechnology
Source: Shri Om Prakash Bhasin Foundation

Electronics and Information Technology
Source: Shri Om Prakash Bhasin Foundation

Engineering including Energy and Aerospace
Source: Shri Om Prakash Bhasin Foundation

Health and Medical Sciences
Source: Shri Om Prakash Bhasin Foundation

See also 

 List of general science and technology awards 
 List of biology awards
 List of engineering awards
 List of medicine awards
 List of physics awards

References

Indian science and technology awards
Indian awards
Awards established in 1985
Physics awards
Research in India
1985 establishments in India